Evergreen Cemetery is located in the West River neighborhood of New Haven, Connecticut. It was founded by some of New Haven's most prominent citizens in 1848. Evergreen Cemetery is a non-sectarian, non-profit organization that is managed by the Association's board of trustees.

Notable burials 
 Hobart B. Bigelow, Governor of Connecticut (1881–1883)
 Edward Bouchet, first PhD recipient of African descent in the United States
 Chauncey B. Brewster, Episcopal clergyman (Bishop of Connecticut, 1899−1928)
 Wilbur L. Cross, Governor of Connecticut (1931–1939) and Professor of English at Yale University
 Edwin S. Greeley, Civil War general
 John Haberle (1856–1933), trompe-l'œil painter
 Bronisław Malinowski, social anthropologist
 William Chester Minor – lexicographer and key contributor to the creation of the Oxford English Dictionary.
 John Addison Porter, chemistry professor at Yale University.
 John Addison Porter, journalist, and first Secretary to the President
 Ilya Tolstoy, writer and son of Leo Tolstoy
 Oliver Winchester – founder of the Winchester repeating rifle company
 Sarah Winchester – wife of William Wirt Winchester and builder of the Winchester Mystery House in San Jose, California
 George Weiss – Hall of Fame Major League Baseball Executive.
 Teresa Wright – Wright won an Academy Award as Best Supporting Actress for "Mrs. Miniver" (1942). Remains donated to Yale medical school, ultimately buried in a small mass grave located in section 14
 One Commonwealth war burial, a Royal Flying Corps Cadet of World War I.

References

External links
 

Geography of New Haven, Connecticut
1848 establishments in Connecticut
Cemeteries in New Haven County, Connecticut
History of New Haven, Connecticut
Cemeteries established in the 1840s